Andrew Jackson, the 7th President of the United States, ran for president twice:

 Andrew Jackson presidential campaign, 1824, the failed campaign Andrew Jackson conducted in 1824
 Andrew Jackson presidential campaign, 1828